A tuning fork is an acoustic resonator in the form of a two-pronged fork with the prongs (tines) formed from a U-shaped bar of elastic metal (usually steel). It resonates at a specific constant pitch when set vibrating by striking it against a surface or with an object, and emits a pure musical tone once the high overtones fade out. A tuning fork's pitch depends on the length and mass of the two prongs. They are traditional sources of standard pitch for tuning musical instruments.

The tuning fork was invented in 1711 by British musician John Shore, sergeant trumpeter and lutenist to the royal court.

Description

A tuning fork is a fork-shaped acoustic resonator used in many applications to produce a fixed tone. The main reason for using the fork shape is that, unlike many other types of resonators, it produces a very pure tone, with most of the vibrational energy at the fundamental frequency. The reason for this is that the frequency of the first overtone is about  =  =  times the fundamental (about  octaves above it). By comparison, the first overtone of a vibrating string or metal bar is one octave above (twice) the fundamental, so when the string is plucked or the bar is struck, its vibrations tend to mix the fundamental and overtone frequencies. When the tuning fork is struck, little of the energy goes into the overtone modes; they also die out correspondingly faster, leaving a pure sine wave at the fundamental frequency. It is easier to tune other instruments with this pure tone.

Another reason for using the fork shape is that it can then be held at the base without damping the oscillation. That is because its principal mode of vibration is symmetric, with the two prongs always moving in opposite directions, so that at the base where the two prongs meet there is a node (point of no vibratory motion) which can therefore be handled without removing energy from the oscillation (damping). However, there is still a tiny motion induced in the handle in its longitudinal direction (thus at right angles to the oscillation of the prongs) which can be made audible using any sort of sound board. Thus by pressing the tuning fork's base against a sound board such as a wooden box, table top, or bridge of a musical instrument, this small motion, but which is at a high acoustic pressure (thus a very high acoustic impedance), is partly converted into audible sound in air which involves a much greater motion (particle velocity) at a relatively low pressure (thus low acoustic impedance). The pitch of a tuning fork can also be heard directly through bone conduction, by pressing the tuning fork against the bone just behind the ear, or even by holding the stem of the fork in one's teeth, conveniently leaving both hands free. Bone conduction using a tuning fork is specifically used in the Weber and Rinne tests for hearing in order to bypass the middle ear. If just held in open air, the sound of a tuning fork is very faint due to the acoustic impedance mismatch between the steel and air. Moreover, since the feeble sound waves emanating from each prong are 180° out of phase, those two opposite waves interfere, largely cancelling each other. Thus when a solid sheet is slid in between the prongs of a vibrating fork, the apparent volume actually increases, as this cancellation is reduced, just as a loudspeaker requires a baffle in order to radiate efficiently.

Commercial tuning forks are tuned to the correct pitch at the factory, and the pitch and frequency in hertz is stamped on them. They can be retuned by filing material off the prongs. Filing the ends of the prongs raises the pitch, while filing the inside of the base of the prongs lowers it.

Currently, the most common tuning fork sounds the note of A = 440 Hz, the standard concert pitch that many orchestras use. That A is the pitch of the violin's second string, the first string of the viola, and an octave above the first string of the cello. Orchestras between 1750 and 1820 mostly used A = 423.5 Hz, though there were many forks and many slightly different pitches. Standard tuning forks are available that vibrate at all the pitches within the central octave of the piano, and also other pitches.

Tuning fork pitch varies slightly with temperature, due mainly to a slight decrease in the modulus of elasticity of steel with increasing temperature. A change in frequency of 48 parts per million per °F (86 ppm per °C) is typical for a steel tuning fork. The frequency decreases (becomes flat) with increasing temperature. Tuning forks are manufactured to have their correct pitch at a standard temperature. The standard temperature is now , but  is an older standard. The pitch of other instruments is also subject to variation with temperature change.

Calculation of frequency
The frequency of a tuning fork depends on its dimensions and what it's made from:

 

where
  is the frequency the fork vibrates at, (SI units: 1/s)
  is the length of the prongs, (m)
  is the Young's modulus (elastic modulus or stiffness) of the material the fork is made from, (Pa or N/m2 or kg/(ms2))
  is the second moment of area of the cross-section, (m4)
  is the density of the fork's material (kg/m3), and
  is the cross-sectional area of the prongs (tines) (m2).

The ratio  in the equation above can be rewritten as  if the prongs are cylindrical with radius , and  if the prongs have rectangular cross-section of width  along the direction of motion.

Uses
Tuning forks have traditionally been used to tune musical instruments, though electronic tuners have largely replaced them. Forks can be driven electrically by placing electronic oscillator-driven electromagnets close to the prongs.

In musical instruments
A number of keyboard musical instruments use principles similar to tuning forks. The most popular of these is the Rhodes piano, in which hammers hit metal tines that vibrate in the magnetic field of a pickup, creating a signal that drives electric amplification. The earlier, un-amplified dulcitone, which used tuning forks directly, suffered from low volume.

In clocks and watches

The quartz crystal that serves as the timekeeping element in modern quartz clocks and watches is in the form of a tiny tuning fork. It usually vibrates at a frequency of 32,768 Hz in the ultrasonic range (above the range of human hearing). It is made to vibrate by small oscillating voltages applied to metal electrodes plated on the surface of the crystal by an electronic oscillator circuit. Quartz is piezoelectric, so the voltage causes the tines to bend rapidly back and forth.

The Accutron, an electromechanical watch developed by Max Hetzel and manufactured by Bulova beginning in 1960, used a 360-hertz steel tuning fork as its timekeeper, powered by electromagnets attached to a battery-powered transistor oscillator circuit. The fork provided greater accuracy than conventional balance wheel watches. The humming sound of the tuning fork was audible when the watch was held to the ear.

Medical and scientific uses

Alternatives to the common A=440 standard include philosophical or scientific pitch with standard pitch of C=512. According to Rayleigh, physicists and acoustic instrument makers used this pitch. The tuning fork John Shore gave to George Frideric Handel produces C=512.

Tuning forks, usually C512, are used by medical practitioners to assess a patient's hearing. This is most commonly done with two exams called the Weber test and Rinne test, respectively. Lower-pitched ones, usually at C128, are also used to check vibration sense as part of the examination of the peripheral nervous system.

Orthopedic surgeons have explored using a tuning fork (lowest frequency C=128) to assess injuries where bone fracture is suspected. They hold the end of the vibrating fork on the skin above the suspected fracture, progressively closer to the suspected fracture. If there is a fracture, the periosteum of the bone vibrates and fires nociceptors (pain receptors), causing a local sharp pain. This can indicate a fracture, which the practitioner refers for medical X-ray. The sharp pain of a local sprain can give a false positive. Established practice, however, requires an X-ray regardless, because it's better than missing a real fracture while wondering if a response means a sprain. A systematic review published in 2014 in BMJ Open suggests that this technique is not reliable or accurate enough for clinical use.

Tuning forks also play a role in several alternative therapy practices, such as sonopuncture and polarity therapy.

Radar gun calibration 
A radar gun that measures the speed of cars or a ball in sports is usually calibrated with a tuning fork. Instead of the frequency, these forks are labeled with the calibration speed and radar band (e.g., X-band or K-band) they are calibrated for.

In gyroscopes
Doubled and H-type tuning forks are used for tactical-grade Vibrating Structure Gyroscopes and various types of microelectromechanical systems.

Level sensors
Tuning fork forms the sensing part of vibrating point level sensors. The tuning fork is kept vibrating at its resonant frequency by a piezoelectric device. Upon coming in contact with solids, amplitude of oscillation goes down, the same is used as a switching parameter for detecting point level for solids. For liquids, the resonant frequency of tuning fork changes upon coming in contact with the liquids, change in frequency is used to detect level.

See also 
 Electronic tuner
 Pitch pipe
 Savart wheel
 Tonometer

References

External links

Onlinetuningfork.com, an online tuning fork using Macromedia Flash Player.

1711 introductions
Musical instrument parts and accessories
Idiophones
Acoustics
Sound